Thorney is a village and civil parish about 2 and a half miles south west of Saxilby railway station, in the Newark and Sherwood district, in the county of Nottinghamshire, England. In 2011, the parish had a population of 248. The parish touches Wigsley, Kettlethorpe, Newton on Trent, Saxilby with Ingleby, Harby, North Clifton, South Clifton and Hardwick.

Features 
There are 6 listed buildings in Thorney.

History 
The name "Thorney" means 'Enclosure of thorn-trees'. Thorney was recorded in the Domesday Book as Torneshaie. Thorney parish also included the townships of Broadholme and Wigsley which became separate parishes in 1866. Iron Age, Bronze age and Roman settlements have been found. There was a Saxon settlement in around 500 AD. In 1853 the manor belonged to Rev. Christopher Nevile but was previously owned by the Nevile family. The parish was part of the Newark wapentake.

References

External links 

 

Villages in Nottinghamshire
Civil parishes in Nottinghamshire
Newark and Sherwood